Canyon Island (Lingít: Aanx̱'atinyé) is an island in the City and Borough of Juneau, Alaska, United States.

History
The Taku people previously lived on the island.  A radio station operated by Pacific Alaska Airways was located on the island as of the 1930s.

The Alaska Department of Fish and Game operated a research station on the island.  Fish wheels are present on the island for the study of salmon.

References

Islands of the Alexander Archipelago
Islands of Juneau, Alaska
Islands of Alaska